The 1983 Winnipeg municipal election was held on October 26, 1983 to elect a mayor, councillors and school trustees in the city of Winnipeg. There were also two referendum questions, on bilingualism and nuclear disarmament.

Bill Norrie defeated Brian Corrin in the mayoral contest.

Results

 Jim Ragsdill was elected to Winnipeg City Council in 1977, and re-elected in 1980 and 1983. He was a vocal critic of Winnipeg's civil service during the early 1980s. He did not seek re-election in 1986.

Results taken from the Winnipeg Free Press newspaper, 27 October 1983.

Footnotes

Winnipeg
Municipal elections in Winnipeg
Winnipeg municipal election
Winnipeg municipal election